This is a partial list of Jupiter's  trojan asteroids (60° behind Jupiter) with numbers 400001–500000 .

400001–500000 

This list contains 295 objects sorted in numerical order.

top

References 
 

 Trojan_4
Jupiter Trojans (Trojan Camp)
Lists of Jupiter trojans